The Man in the Net is a 1959 American film noir starring Alan Ladd and Carolyn Jones.  The taut drama was directed by Michael Curtiz. The supporting cast features Diane Brewster.

Plot
Commercial artist John Hamilton (Alan Ladd) and wife Linda (Carolyn Jones) leave New York and move to Stoneville, Connecticut, in the New England countryside, to escape the bustle of the city and because of John's growing concern about Linda's alcoholism.

John quickly befriends the town's children, but he's treated like an outsider by many of the adults. Linda misses their social life in New York, as well as the salary John made there.

She insists they attend a party at the home of Brad (John Lupton) and Vickie Carey (Diane Brewster), where the guests include another married couple, Roz (Betty Lou Holland) and Gordon Moreland (Tom Helmore), the wealthy father of Brad Carey. A scene is created by an intoxicated Linda, who insults John and lies that he gave her a black eye, confessing to Vickie after the party that she actually fell while drunk. In anger, she tells John she's been having an extramarital affair with a local policeman, Steve Ritter (Charles McGraw).

John agrees to go to New York for a job interview arranged by his wife behind his back. When he returns, Linda is nowhere to be found. A suitcase belonging to her is spotted by a city dump. Unable to find John's wife, police and neighbors suspect him of murder. Villagers stone his house. Ritter arrives to arrest him. John flees and is given refuge by the children, who know of a secret cave.

Evidence is found linking Linda to another man. A tape recording is left as bait, and John, who suspects someone else, is surprised when Brad turns up looking for the tape. It reveals he's the one Linda had the affair with and the one who physically abused her, but John soon discovers that it was Mr. Carey who actually killed Linda to cover up for his cowardly son.

Cast
 Alan Ladd as John Hamilton
 Carolyn Jones as Linda Hamilton
 Diane Brewster as Vickie Carey
 John Lupton as Brad Carey
 Charles McGraw as Sheriff Steve Ritter
 Tom Helmore as Gordon Moreland
 Betty Lou Holland as Roz Moreland
 John Alexander as Mr. Carey, Brad's father
 Ed Binns as State Police Capt. Green
 Kathryn Givney as Mrs. Carey, Brad's mother
 Barbara Beaird as Emily Jones
 Susan Gordon as Angel Jones
 Michael McGreevey as Buck Ritter
 Charles Herbert as Timmie Moreland
 Steve Perry as Leroy, Alonzo's son

Production

The film was based on a 1956 novel by Hugh Wheeler, writing as Patrick Quentin (a pseudonym that Wheeler and three other authors also used in collaborative efforts). Film rights were bought the following year by the Mirisch Company, who had a deal with United Artists. Alan Ladd was signed to star in January 1958. Reginald Rose, who had just written Man of the West for the Mirisches, signed to write the screenplay. Michael Curtiz directed.

Filming started 23 June. The film was mostly shot in Hollywood at the Goldwyn Studios with some location shooting at Raceland in Framingham, Massachusetts. Many of the outdoor scenes were shot in Thompson, Connecticut, on the town common where a set was built (gas station) and at the Ballard Farm. Also, the exterior of "The Chimney House", a location that figures prominently in the story is Roseland Cottage in Woodstock, Connecticut.

The paintings done by Ladd's character were painted by Frank Stovall, as well as two of Carolyn Jones by Harold M. Kramer and others by Hilyard Brown.

Reception
When the film was released, Richard W. Neson, film critic for The New York Times, wrote "More interesting is the dialogue by Mr. Rose and his preoccupation with injustice. The lines show a keen love for kids and an honest regard for the need to interject reality into a yarn that is tediously familiar once it settles down into its melodramatic formula. Miss Jones plays the wife with controlled fanaticism. Mr. Ladd, on the other hand, performs in his usual, cool style, which under the hectic circumstances mutes his personality to the point of unreality."

See also
 List of American films of 1959

References

External links

 
 
 
 
 The Man in the Net informational page and DVD review by novelist Jamie S. Rich at DVD Talk 
 The Man in the Net informational page at actress Susan Gordon web-site
 

1959 films
American mystery films
American black-and-white films
1950s English-language films
Film noir
Films about missing people
Films directed by Michael Curtiz
Films produced by Walter Mirisch
Films set in Connecticut
United Artists films
Films scored by Hans J. Salter
1950s mystery films
1950s American films